Ángel Leonides Leyes (22 April 1930, in Talita, San Luis Province – 24 June 1996, in Buenos Aires) was an Argentine boxer who was Latin American featherweight champion in 1948 and 1952. He also wins Argentine featherweight championship in 1948, 1949 and two times in 1952. He participated in the 1952 Summer Olympics in Helsinki, Finland.

He was one of the most popular Argentine boxers in the early fifties in Argentina.

References

People from San Luis Province
1930 births
1996 deaths
Boxers at the 1952 Summer Olympics
Argentine male boxers
Olympic boxers of Argentina
Featherweight boxers